Italians in Spain are one of the largest communities of immigrant groups in Spain, with  Italian citizens in the country; conversely,  residents in Spain were born in Italy. A significant part of the Italian citizens in Spain are not born in Italy but emigrate from Argentina or Uruguay.

The immigration rate of Italian nationals increased in the second part of the 2010s, and, in 2018, Italians trumped Chinese nationals as the third biggest foreign nationality in the Spanish workforce. Most of the Italians citizens dwell in Catalonia, the Community of Madrid, the Valencian Community, the Balearic Islands and the Canary Islands.

Over 70% of Italian citizens residing in Spain are on retirement living in the Canary Islands, Costa Blanca and Costa del Sol.

Foreign population of Italian citizenship in Spain

See also 
 Italy–Spain relations

References 

Spain
Italian emigrants to Spain